Baptist Hill High School is a public high school in Hollywood, South Carolina. It is part of the Charleston County School District. Most of its students are African American. Bobcats are the school mascot.

The school was built circa 1953 at a cost of approximately $250,000. In 1954, Jet reported that a janitor at the school's new cement block building believed it was haunted by a student who drowned before receiving a diploma. In 1977, the school was set on fire, causing $125,000 in damage.

In 2017, the school's football team played for a state championship.

The school district launched a cultural competency program to address much lower scores among African American and Hispanic students than white students at its largely segregated schools.

References

Public high schools in South Carolina
Schools in Charleston County, South Carolina